The Soriano-Pedroso was a French automobile manufactured in Biarritz from 1919 until 1924.  Built by two Spaniards the Marques de San Carlos de Pedroso and the Marques de Ivanrey Ricardo Soriano Sholtz von Hermensdorff, the original models were Ballot (automobile)-engined  and  cars.  The men next built a  Ruby-engined cyclecar, and designed the prototype for a straight-eight; their main product, however, was marine engines.

References
 David Burgess Wise, The New Illustrated Encyclopedia of Automobiles.

Defunct motor vehicle manufacturers of France